This article contains a list of fossil-bearing stratigraphic units in the state of Delaware, U.S.

Sites

See also

 Paleontology in Delaware

References

 

Delaware
Stratigraphic units
Stratigraphy of Delaware
Delaware geography-related lists
United States geology-related lists